The Wisper is a  river in Hesse, Germany, right tributary of the Rhine. Its source is in the western Taunus, Rheingau-Taunus-Kreis district, near a small village named Wisper (municipality Heidenrod). It flows southwest through a densely forested valley with some medieval castle ruins surrounded by a popular hiking area.  A man-made lake, the Wispersee, is stocked with trout and is a popular fishing destination. The Wisper flows into the Rhine at Lorch.

The river ran through the temporary state Free State Bottleneck from 1919 to 1923.

See also
List of rivers in Hesse

References

Rivers of Hesse
Rheingau-Taunus-Kreis
Rivers of the Taunus
Middle Rhine
Rivers of Germany
Rheingau